Juno is an unincorporated community in Henderson County, in the U.S. state of Tennessee.

History
Juno was founded ca. 1846. A post office called Juno was established in 1847, and remained in operation until 1957.

References

Unincorporated communities in Henderson County, Tennessee